Carlston may refer to:
 Carlston (name)
 Carlston Township, Freeborn County, Minnesota
 Carlston Annis Shell Mound, archaeological site in Kentucky, U.S.